Fobia is an album released by Mexican pop rock band Fobia. Their self-titled debut album was released in 1990. The songs are primarily themed around common phobias and anxieties, filled with dark humor and melodic music. Songs like Los muñecos and Las moscas deal with the fear of dolls and flies respectively. Other songs like Dios bendiga a los gusanos and El crucifijo deal with the anxieties of love. El microbito delivers humor and a quick change of pace towards the album's finale.

The band received critical and commercial success, added to the fact that a new wave of Rock en español saw new contemporary bands come out of the woodwork.

The original lineup was:
 Leonardo de Lozanne (voice)
 Cha! (bass)
 Francisco Huidobro (guitar)
 Gabriel Kuri (drums)
 Iñaki (keyboards)

Track listing
 Los muñecos (The Dolls)
 Dios bendiga a los gusanos (God bless the worms)
 Las moscas (Flies)
 El cumpleaños (The birthday)
 Corazón en caracol (Heart in snail)
 La iguana (The iguana)
 Pudriendo (Rotting)
 Puedo rascarme solo (I can scratch myself)
 El microbito (The little microbe)
 El crucifijo (The crucifix)

References

1990 debut albums
Fobia albums